The 2022 World Junior Speed Skating Championships took place from 28 to 30 January 2022 in Innsbruck, Austria.

Schedule
All times are local (UTC+1).

Medal summary

Medal table

Men's events

Women's events

References

External links
Results

2022
World Junior
International speed skating competitions hosted by Austria
2022 World Junior Speed Skating
World Junior Speed Skating Championships
2022 in youth sport